

Bruno Bosteels (born 1967, Leuven, Belgium) is a professor of Spanish and Comparative Literature at Columbia University. He served until 2010 as the General Editor of diacritics. Bosteels is best known to the English-speaking world for his work on Latin American literature and culture and his translations of the work of Alain Badiou (a well-known French philosopher). Theory of the Subject appeared in 2009, Bosteels' translation of Badiou's Théorie du sujet (originally published in France in 1982).

Bosteels has research interests spanning contemporary philosophy, literary criticism, political and critical theory.

Bibliography
Original works
 Badiou o el recomienzo del materialismo dialéctico (Santiago de Chile: Palinodia, 2007) 
 Alain Badiou, une trajectoire polémique (Editions La Fabrique, 2009) 
The Actuality of Communism (New York & London: Verso Books, 2011)   (hardcover)
Badiou and Politics (Durham & London: Duke University Press, 2011)  (paperback)
Marx and Freud in Latin America: Politics, Psychoanalysis, and Religion in Times of Terror (New York & London: Verso Books, 2012)  
 La Comuna mexicana (Ciudad de México: Ediciones Akal, 2021)  
 
Translations of books
Alain Badiou. Theory of the Subject, (New York: Continuum, 2009):  (hardcover)
Alain Badiou. Wittgenstein's Anti-Philosophy (New York & London: Verso, 2011)  (hardcover)

Essays
"Post-Maoism: Badiou and Politics." Alain Badiou and Cultural Revolution. Special issue of positions: east asia culture critique 13.3 (2005): pp. 576–634
"Alain Badiou's Theory of the Subject: The Recommencement of Dialectical Materialism." Lacan: His Silent Partners. Ed. Slavoj Žižek (London: Verso, 2006)
"Hegel in America." Religion, Politics, and the Dialectic: Hegel and the Opening of the Infinite. Ed. Clayton Crockett, Creston Davis, and Slavoj Žižek. (New York: Columbia University Press, 2009)
"Rancière's Leftism, or, Politics and Its Discontents." Jacques Rancière: Politics, History, Aesthetics. Ed. Phil Watts and Gabriel Rockhill. (Durham & London: Duke University Press, 2009).
"Badiou and Hegel." Badiou: Key Concepts. Ed. Justin Clemens and A. J. Barlett. (London: Acumen, 2010).
"The Leftist Hypothesis: Communism in the Age of Terror." The Idea of Communism. Ed.  Costas Douzinas and Slavoj Žižek. (New York: Verso, 2010).

Interviews
"Can Change Be Thought? A Dialogue with Alain Badiou." Alain Badiou: Philosophy And Its Conditions. Ed. Gabriel Riera (Albany: State University of New York Press, 2005) – this Bosteels interview of Badiou has been reprinted in the appendix to Bosteels' book Badiou and Politics, published in 2011

References

External links
Biography at Cornell
Who Is Derrida’s Nietzsche? – essay/talk by Bosteels

Living people
1967 births
Writers from Leuven
Cornell University faculty
French–English translators